Tabidze (Georgian: ტაბიძე) is a Georgian surname that may refer to the following notable people:

Galaktion Tabidze, Georgian poet
Jemal Tabidze (born 1996), Georgian football player
Lasha Tabidze (born 1997), Georgian rugby union player
Titsian Tabidze(1890–1937), Georgian poet

Georgian-language surnames